The Tenerife Open was a professional golf tournament on the European Tour. Formerly known as the Turespaña Open De Canaria when the tournament was last held in 1995. In 2021, the tournament was revived into the European Tour schedule. It is played in the Canary Islands of Spain, usually in Tenerife. Turespaña is the Spanish national tourism body, and it sponsored several golf tournaments in the 1980s and 1990s to promote Spain's role as a leading warm weather golf holiday destination in Europe. The most notable winner was Spaniard José María Olazábal, who later went on to win two Masters.

Winners

External links
Coverage on the European Tour's official site

Former European Tour events
Golf tournaments in Spain
Sport in Tenerife
Recurring sporting events established in 1989
1989 establishments in Spain